Sordid Lives: The Series is an American television series created, written, and directed by Del Shores. It acts as a prequel to the 2000 film Sordid Lives, the show is set in small town Texas and centers on the Ingram family.

It stars Rue McClanahan, Olivia Newton-John, Caroline Rhea, Leslie Jordan, Beth Grant, Jason Dottley and most of the original cast of the film.

It premiered on Logo in July 2008.  In Canada, Sordid Lives the uncut version can be seen on Super Channel (also in HD) and the censored version on Out TV. According to Logo's contact page a second season will not be produced due to a lack of funding, and the Logo online web page for the series is no longer available.

The series premiered in the UK on Film24 in August 2009.

Premise
Matriarch Peggy Ingram (Rue McClanahan) takes in the town bar singer Bitsy Mae Harling (Olivia Newton-John) who has just been released from prison. Peggy's wild child daughter LaVonda (Ann Walker) lives with Peggy's chain-smoking sister Sissy (Beth Grant), while Peggy's good girl Latrelle (Bonnie Bedelia) maintains an image of seeming perfection.

Peggy's third child, Earl "Brother Boy" Ingram (Leslie Jordan), is locked in a mental institution where he performs as Tammy Wynette. He plots to escape while he attends therapy sessions with the crazy Dr. Eve (Rosemary Alexander) who believes she can de-homosexualize him.

LaVonda's white trash best friend Noleta (Caroline Rhea) lives in a trailer in Sissy's backyard with her husband G.W. (David Steen), a Vietnam veteran with two wooden legs. G.W. escapes regularly to the local bar in town amidst a small crowd of regulars including brothers Wardell (Newell Alexander) and Odell (David Cowgill), Bitsy Mae, and the bar's resident drunk Juanita (Sarah Hunley).

Latrelle's son Ty (Jason Dottley) is an actor living in Los Angeles and struggling with several therapists (including ones played by Margaret Cho, Carson Kressley, and Candis Cayne) to come to terms with his homosexuality. Along the way he deals with his first boyfriend (Ted Detwiler), his stalker ex-girlfriend (Sharron Alexis), a vengeful trick (Emerson Collins), and the difficulty of coming out to his straight best friend (Robert Lewis Stephenson) and his family back in Texas.

Production
Sordid Lives: The Series was executive produced by Stanley M. Brooks of Once Upon A Time Films, a Santa Monica, California based production company known for its television programming, for MTV Networks' Logo Channel as its first original series.  The series was scored by composer Joe Patrick Ward. The first season of 12 episodes was shot in Shreveport, Louisiana, from November 28, 2007, to January 27, 2008.

Cast and characters

Ingram Family tree

Episodes

Soundtrack
Sordid Lives Theme - Olivia Newton-John
So Bad - Olivia Newton-John
None of My Business - Olivia Newton-John	
You Look Like a Dick to Me - Olivia Newton-John
Jack Daniels - Olivia Newton-John
Slow Burn - Olivia Newton-John
I Don't Want to Play House - Georgette Jones
I Still Believe in Fairy Tales - Georgette Jones
Precious Memories - Georgette Jones
You Done Me Wrong - Sean Wiggins & Lone Goat	
I Could Get Over Him - Kacey Jones
Joyful Sound -	Debby Holiday

DVD release
Visual Entertainment released the complete series on DVD in Region 1 (Canada only) on October 13, 2009.  The 3-disc set features all 12 episodes of the series uncensored and uncut as well as several bonus features including deleted scenes, bloopers and several performances by Olivia Newton-John.

Well Go USA released the complete series on DVD and Blu-ray in the United States. The set contains all 12 episodes uncensored and uncut, as well as special features including deleted scenes, bloopers, performances by Olivia Newton-John and music videos (series promo/trailers).

International broadcasters
 Super Channel - Canada
 TIMM - Germany
 Yes Stars Comedy - Israel
 Film 24 - UK
 OutTV - Netherlands
 Série Club - France

References

External links
 
 Sordid Lives Fansite

2000s American LGBT-related comedy television series
2008 American television series debuts
2008 American television series endings
Logo TV original programming